Salvatore Jacolino (born 24 December 1950 in Agrigento) is an Italian professional football coach and a former player.

External links

1950 births
Living people
People from Agrigento
Italian footballers
Serie A players
Juventus F.C. players
Piacenza Calcio 1919 players
Ternana Calcio players
Brescia Calcio players
S.P.A.L. players
U.S. Alessandria Calcio 1912 managers
Italian football managers
A.S.D. Calcio Ivrea managers
Association football midfielders
Footballers from Sicily
A.S.D. La Biellese players
Sportspeople from the Province of Agrigento